Pays Plat Water Aerodrome  was located near to Pays Plat, Ontario Canada.

References

Defunct seaplane bases in Ontario